The 1890 Lafayette football team was an American football team that represented Lafayette College as an independent during the 1890 college football season. Playing without a regular coach, the team compiled a 2–5–1 record and was outscored by a total of 166 to 100. Joseph Fox was the team captain, and G. Harvey was the manager. The team played its home games on The Quad in Easton, Pennsylvania.

Schedule

References

Lafayette
Lafayette Leopards football seasons
Lafayette football